Forts Randolph and Buhlow State Historic Site  in Pineville, Louisiana, a state historic site in Louisiana consisting of Fort Randolph and Fort Buhlow. Both of these forts are in the National Register of Historic Places.

Attractions
Forts Randolph and Buhlow State Historic Site includes the remains of Bailey's Dam.  This dam allowed for the Union Fleet, under the command of Admiral David Porter, to escape below the rapids on the Red River during the Union retreat after the Battle of Mansfield.  The site also includes a visitor center, an elevated boardwalk, and a field for Civil War re-enactments.

References

External links

Louisiana State Historic Sites
Protected areas of Rapides Parish, Louisiana
Museums in Rapides Parish, Louisiana
Military and war museums in Louisiana
Pineville, Louisiana